Panzarini Hills is a group of hills lying north of San Martín Glacier and forming the north half of the Argentina Range, Pensacola Mountains. Mapped by United States Geological Survey (USGS) from surveys and U.S. Navy air photos, 1956–67. Named by Advisory Committee on Antarctic Names (US-ACAN) for Admiral Rodolfo N. Panzarini, Director of the Instituto Antartico Argentino in this period.

Features
Geographical features include:

 Arcondo Nunatak
 Areta Rock
 Giró Nunatak
 Mount Ferrara
 Mount Spann
 Suarez Nunatak
 Vaca Nunatak

Further reading 
 Gunter Faure, Teresa M. Mensing, The Transantarctic Mountains: Rocks, Ice, Meteorites and Water, P 246

External links 

 Panzarini Hill on USGS website
 Panzarini Hill on AADC website
 Panzarini Hill on SCAR website
 Panzarini Hill distance calculator
 Panzarini Hill on peakvisor.com

References 

Hills of Queen Elizabeth Land
Pensacola Mountains